Kwame Peprah (born 16 December 2000) is a Ghanaian footballer who plays as a striker for South African Premier Division side Orlando Pirates.

Career 
Peprah gained prominence in the 2020–21 Ghana Premier League, when he became the main striker for Kumasi-based club King Faisal, scoring 8 goals as at 20 February 2021 and winning a number of man of the match awards.

On the 26th of August 2021 he was announced as a new Orlando Pirates player as a promising talent.

References 

Living people
2000 births
Ghanaian footballers
Association football forwards
King Faisal Babes FC players
Ghana Premier League players